Route 55 is a state highway in the western part of the U.S. state of Connecticut, running from the New York state line in Sherman to New Milford.  It functions as an extension of New York State Route 55 to US 7.

Route description
Route 55 begins at the New York state line in rural northern Sherman, connecting with New York State Route 55 in the hamlet of Webatuck (ultimately leading to New York State Route 22). It travels eastward for  then intersects with the northern end of Route 39, which leads to the town center of Sherman. Route 55 becomes Webatuck Road in New Milford, running for another  until it ends in the Gaylordsville section of New Milford at an intersection with US 7 near the Housatonic River. Within the town of Sherman, Route 55 has no street name and is known simply as "Route 55". Route 55 is a rural collector road and carries average daily traffic volumes of 3,100 between Route 39 and US 7.

History
In the 1920s, the road between the New York state line (towards the hamlet of Webatuck) and the Gaylordsville section of New Milford was designated as a state highway known as Highway 129. The old state highway was renumbered to modern Route 55 as part of the 1932 state highway renumbering. The number 55 was chosen to match New York State Route 55 across the state line, which was also extended north from its original eastern terminus in Pawling to Wingdale (via an overlap with New York State Route 22) and then east through Webatuck to the Connecticut state line.

Major intersections

References

053
Transportation in Fairfield County, Connecticut
Transportation in Litchfield County, Connecticut